Leptosiaphos vigintiserierum, also known as the African five-toed skink, is a species of lizard in the family Scincidae. It is found in Cameroon and Equatorial Guinea (Bioko).

References

Leptosiaphos
Skinks of Africa
Reptiles of Cameroon
Reptiles of Equatorial Guinea
Reptiles described in 1897
Taxa named by Bror Yngve Sjöstedt